Andrew McIntyre (9 August 1855 – 30 March 1941) was a Scottish footballer who played as a full back.

Career
Born in Bonhill, McIntyre played club football for Vale of Leven and made two appearances for Scotland. With Vale of Leven he won the Scottish Cup on three occasions.

References

1855 births
1941 deaths
Scottish footballers
Scotland international footballers
Vale of Leven F.C. players
Association football fullbacks
Place of death missing
People from Bonhill
Footballers from West Dunbartonshire